Big Bad Mama II is a 1987 American action–crime–sexploitation comedy film produced by Roger Corman, directed by Jim Wynorski, starring Angie Dickinson, Robert Culp, Danielle Brisebois and Julie McCullough. While it has been identified as a sequel to Big Bad Mama (1974), it is more accurately described as a reboot, as the film exists on a parallel plane with its predecessor.

Plot
In 1934, Wilma McClatchie's husband is shot down by police attempting to evict the McClatchies from their farm. Wilma's entry into a bank-robbing career occurs from a need for righteous revenge against Morgan Crawford, the banker who foreclosed on her home and is now running for governor of Texas. She tells her two daughters, Polly and Billie Jean: "The best way to kill a man is to destroy his dreams." So, among other things, she abducts Crawford's son, Jordan, and turns him into a willing gang member with her daughters' help. Also aiding and abetting the McClatchies in the plan is an Eastern journalist, who sees the thieving clan as his front-page ticket.

Cast
Angie Dickinson as Wilma McClatchie
Robert Culp as Daryl Pearson
Danielle Brisebois as Billie Jean McClatchie
Julie McCullough as Polly McClatchie
Bruce Glover as Morgan Crawford
Jeff Yagher as Jordan Crawford
Jacque Lynn Colton as Alma
Ebbe Roe Smith as Lucas Stroud
Charles Cyphers as Stark
Kelli Maroney as Willie McClatchie
Linda Shayne as Bank Teller

Production
Filming started in June 1987 and took four weeks.

Reception
The Los Angeles Times called it "one of the strangest sequels ever to crash through a roadblock...the first genuine moral fairy tale of the genre."

References

External links

Big Bad Mama II at TCMDB
Review of film at Temple of Schlock

1987 films
1980s crime action films
American sequel films
Films directed by Jim Wynorski
American crime action films
1980s English-language films
Films produced by Roger Corman
1980s American films